Ján Zápotoka (born 23 March 1988) is a Slovak footballer.

Career

Club
In August 2009, he joined Lech Poznań on a four-year contract.

In February 2011, he was loaned to MFK Dubnica on a half year deal.

International
He was a part of Slovakia U-19 team.

References

External links
 
 

1988 births
Living people
People from Bardejov
Sportspeople from the Prešov Region
Slovak footballers
Slovak expatriate footballers
Association football midfielders
Partizán Bardejov players
FK Dubnica players
Lech Poznań players
FK Poprad players
Expatriate footballers in Poland
Slovak Super Liga players
Ekstraklasa players
Slovak expatriate sportspeople in Poland